Rexroth can mean:
Bosch Rexroth, an engineering firm based in Lohr am Main in Germany
Kenneth Rexroth, an American poet
Natanael Rexroth-Berg, alias Natanael Berg, was a Swedish composer 
Matthias Rexroth, a German operatic countertenor